A Personal Journey with Martin Scorsese Through American Movies is a 1995 British documentary film of 225 minutes in length, presented by Martin Scorsese and produced by the British Film Institute.

In the film Martin Scorsese examines a selection of his favorite American films grouped according to four different types of directors: the director as storyteller; the director as an illusionist such as D.W. Griffith and F. W. Murnau, who created new editing techniques among other innovations that made the appearance of sound and color possible later on; the director as a smuggler such as filmmakers Douglas Sirk, Samuel Fuller, and Vincente Minnelli, who used to hide subversive messages in their films; and the director as an iconoclast, those filmmakers attacking social conventionalism such as Charles Chaplin, Erich von Stroheim, Orson Welles, Elia Kazan, Nicholas Ray, Stanley Kubrick, Arthur Penn, and Sam Peckinpah.

Summary
The documentary is structured in segments:
Part I
The director's dilemma 
The director as storyteller
The Western
The Gangster film
The Musical
Part II
The director as illusionist
The director as smuggler I
Part III
The director as smuggler II
The director as iconoclast 

It was originally shown on television in the UK in 1995.

Films mentioned
(Roughly in the order of the appearance.)

Part I
The Bad and the Beautiful, 1952, directed by Vincente Minnelli
Duel in the Sun, nicknamed "Lust in the Dust", 1946 Western film directed by King Vidor, William Dieterle and others
The Girl Can't Help It, 1956 Musical film directed by Frank Tashlin
Bigger Than Life, 1956 directed by Nicholas Ray
Vertigo, 1958 psychological thriller film directed by Alfred Hitchcock
The Naked Kiss, 1964 neo-noir film written and directed by Samuel Fuller
Murder by Contract, 1958 film noir directed by Irving Lerner
The Red House, 1947 psychological thriller directed by	Delmer Daves
The Phenix City Story, 1955 film noir directed by Phil Karlson
Sullivan's Travels, 1941 comedy film written and directed by Preston Sturges
The Crowd, 1928 silent film directed by King Vidor
The Big Parade, 1925 silent film directed by King Vidor
Shadow of a Doubt, 1943 thriller film directed by Alfred Hitchcock
Mr. Smith Goes to Washington, 1939, directed by Frank Capra

The Director as Storyteller
The Western
The Great Train Robbery, 1903 Western film written, produced, and directed by Edwin S. Porter
The Musketeers of Pig Alley, 1912, directed by D. W. Griffith
High Sierra, 1941, directed by Raoul Walsh
Colorado Territory, 1949 western film directed by Raoul Walsh (a remake of the 1941 High Sierra) 
Stagecoach, 1939 western film directed by John Ford
She Wore a Yellow Ribbon, 1949 western film directed by John Ford
The Searchers, 1956 western film directed by John Ford
The Furies, 1950 American Western film directed by Anthony Mann
The Naked Spur, 1953 American Western film directed by Anthony Mann
The Tall T, 1957 Western film directed by Budd Boetticher
The Left Handed Gun, 1958 American western film and the film directorial debut of Arthur Penn
Unforgiven, 1992 American Western film produced and directed by Clint Eastwood
Directed by John Ford 1971 documentary directed by Peter Bogdanovich
The Gangster Film
The Public Enemy, 1931 American Pre-Code crime film directed by William A. Wellman
Regeneration, 1915, directed by Raoul Walsh
Scarface, 1932 American gangster film directed by Howard Hawks (and Richard Rosson)
The Roaring Twenties, 1939 crime thriller directed by Raoul Walsh
I Walk Alone, 1948 film noir directed by Byron Haskin.
Force of Evil, 1948 film noir directed by Abraham Polonsky
Point Blank, 1967 American crime film directed by John Boorman
The Musical
Gold Diggers of 1935, 1935 musical film directed and choreographed by Busby Berkeley
Gold Diggers of 1933, 1933 musical film directed by Mervyn LeRoy, staged and choreographed by Busby Berkeley
42nd Street, 1933 musical film directed by Lloyd Bacon with choreography by Busby Berkeley
Footlight Parade, 1933 musical film directed by Lloyd Bacon with choreography by Busby Berkeley
Meet Me in St. Louis, 1944 musical film directed by Vincente Minnelli
My Dream Is Yours, 1949 musical and comedy film directed by Michael Curtiz
New York, New York, 1977 musical directed by Martin Scorsese (film mentioned in connection with My Dream Is Yours)
The Band Wagon, 1953 musical film directed by Vincente Minnelli
A Star Is Born, 1954 musical film directed by George Cukor
All That Jazz, 1979 musical film directed by Bob Fosse

Part II

The Director as Illusionist
The Cameraman, 1928 silent comedy directed by Edward Sedgwick and an uncredited Buster Keaton
The Birth of a Nation, 1915 silent film directed by D. W. Griffith
Death's Marathon, 1913 silent film directed by D. W. Griffith
Cabiria, 1914 Italian silent film directed by Giovanni Pastrone
Intolerance, 1916 silent film directed by D. W. Griffith
The Ten Commandments (1923), 1923 silent film directed by Cecil B. DeMille
Samson and Delilah, 1949, directed by Cecil B. DeMille
The Ten Commandments (1956), 1956, directed by Cecil B. DeMille
Sunrise: A Song of Two Humans, 1927 silent film directed by F. W. Murnau
Seventh Heaven, 1927 silent film directed by Frank Borzage
Anna Christie, 1930, directed by Clarence Brown
Her Man, 1930, directed by Tay Garnett
The Big House, 1930, directed by George W. Hill
Leave Her to Heaven, 1945 film noir directed by John M. Stahl
Johnny Guitar, 1954 Western film directed by Nicholas Ray
The Robe, 1953 Biblical epic film directed by Henry Koster
East of Eden, 1955, directed by Elia Kazan
Some Came Running, 1958, directed by Vincente Minnelli
Land of the Pharaohs, 1955, directed and produced by Howard Hawks
The Fall of the Roman Empire, 1964, directed by Anthony Mann
The Young Indiana Jones Chronicles, American television series from 4 March 1992 to 24 July 1993, created and executively produced by George Lucas, directed by various directors
2001: A Space Odyssey, 1968 science fiction film produced and directed by Stanley Kubrick

The Director as Smuggler
Cat People, 1942 horror film directed by Jacques Tourneur
I Walked with a Zombie, 1943 horror film directed by Jacques Tourneur
Letter from an Unknown Woman, 1948 film directed by Max Ophüls, based on the novella written by Stefan Zweig 
Scarlet Street, 1945 American film noir directed by Fritz Lang
Detour, 1945, directed by Edgar G. Ulmer
Double Indemnity, 1944 film noir directed by Billy Wilder
Crime Wave, 1954 film noir directed by André De Toth
Outrage, 1950, directed by noted film noir actress and pioneering female director Ida Lupino
Gun Crazy, 1950 film noir directed by Joseph H. Lewis
T-Men, 1947 film noir directed by Anthony Mann
Raw Deal, 1948 film noir directed by Anthony Mann
Kiss Me Deadly, 1955 film noir directed by Robert Aldrich

Part III
Silver Lode, 1954, directed by Allan Dwan
All That Heaven Allows, 1955, directed by Douglas Sirk
Bigger Than Life, 1956, directed by Nicholas Ray
Forty Guns, 1957 western film directed by Samuel Fuller
Pickup on South Street, 1953 film noir directed by Samuel Fuller
Shock Corridor, 1963, directed by Samuel Fuller
Two Weeks in Another Town, 1962, directed by Vincente Minnelli

The Director as Iconoclast
Broken Blossoms, 1919 silent film directed by D. W. Griffith
The Wedding March, 1928 silent film directed by Erich von Stroheim
I Am a Fugitive from a Chain Gang, 1932, directed by Mervyn LeRoy
Hell's Highway, 1932, directed by Rowland Brown
Wild Boys of the Road, 1933, directed by William Wellman
Heroes for Sale, 1933, directed by William Wellman
The Scarlet Empress, 1934, directed and produced by Josef von Sternberg
Citizen Kane, 1941, directed by and starring Orson Welles
The Magnificent Ambersons, 1942, directed and written by Orson Welles
The Great Dictator, 1940, directed by Charlie Chaplin
A Streetcar Named Desire, 1951, directed by Elia Kazan
On the Waterfront, 1954, directed by Elia Kazan
Apache, 1954, directed by Robert Aldrich
Blackboard Jungle, 1955, directed by Richard Brooks
The Wild One, 1953, Directed by László Benedek
Advise & Consent, 1962, directed by Otto Preminger
Paths of Glory, 1957, directed by Stanley Kubrick
I Want to Live!, 1958 film noir directed by Robert Wise
The Man with the Golden Arm, 1955, directed by Otto Preminger
Sweet Smell of Success, 1957 film noir directed by Alexander Mackendrick
One, Two, Three, 1961 comedy directed by Billy Wilder
Bonnie and Clyde, 1967, directed by Arthur Penn
Lolita, 1962, directed by Stanley Kubrick
Barry Lyndon, 1975, directed by Stanley Kubrick
Faces, 1968, directed by John Cassavetes
America America, 1963, directed by Elia Kazan
The Grapes of Wrath, 1940, directed by John Ford

See also
The Story of Film, a 2011 documentary film by Mark Cousins similar in content
New Hollywood
Classical Hollywood cinema

References

External links
 
 

1995 films
Films directed by Martin Scorsese
Films scored by Elmer Bernstein
British documentary films
Documentary films about the cinema of the United States
Documentary films about film directors and producers
History of film
1995 documentary films
1990s English-language films
1990s British films